Cómplices Tour was a concert tour by the Mexican singer Luis Miguel to promote his album Cómplices. The tour consisted of 91 concerts and ran through, US, Canada, Dominican Republic, Puerto Rico, Chile, Argentina, Uruguay and Mexico between 2008 and 2009, grossing $36.1 million from 73 shows reported with 450,000 spectators.

History

To promote Cómplices, Luis Miguel began his Cómplices Tour on 3 September 2008 in Seattle, Washington. He toured in the United States for two months, in states like California, Colorado, Texas, New York, Florida, among others. Playing a total of 40 concerts, with a show also in Toronto, Canada. To finish the US tour in Orlando, Florida on 9 November. Luis Miguel continued touring in Dominican Republic, Puerto Rico and Chile. In Argentina sold 200,000 tickets for his four shows in the Vélez Sarsfield Stadium in Buenos Aires, and 100,000 more for the rest concerts in the country. The first leg of the tour ended 5 December 2008 in Punta del Este, Uruguay, completing 53 concerts in 94 days.

The second leg of the tour started in the Mexico City's Nacional Auditorium on 20 January 2009. He tried to break his previous record in this venue with 30 concerts in the same tour, achieved with México En La Piel Tour. However, he only completed 25 shows. He continues his Mexican tour with four concerts in the Telmex Auditorium of Guadalajara, and another four concerts in Monterrey's Arena. He completed the last 10 concerts of 25 scheduled in Mexico City between 24 February to 8 March. From 12 to 15 September he played the last four concerts of the tour in The Colosseum at Caesars Palace in Las Vegas. The entire tour consisted of 91 concerts in 42 cities and 8 countries.

Miguel was accompanied by a 12-piece band during his tour which included horns, keyboards, guitars, two female backup singers, and a 11-piece mariachi band. His hour and forty-five minute concert consisted mainly of pop songs and ballads from Cómplices and his earlier career, as well as medleys of boleros and mariachi songs from his past catalog in a couple of medleys.
The stage was made up of LED screens displaying abstract images in each song,  3 big screens, one in the middle and one on each side of the stage, also included crystal clear steps and a gleaming floor, surrounded by a display of powerful lights and sound. Miguel changes clothes three times during the show, wearing suits from Armani, Zegna and Hugo Boss. At the end of the show the singer throws to the audience black beach balls and tour T-shirts.

Critical reception
Regarding Luis Miguel's performance in Chicago, the Chicago Sun-Times editor Laura Emerick commented that the concert "displayed Luismi in his many musical phases: Latin pop crooner, bolero specialist, pop-rock swinger and mariachi master". She noted that Miguel "was all smiles, all upbeat attitude and genuinely happy to be there", and complimented the five-minute overture and video-clip reel that "Elvis might have admired". Also commented that "Luismi appeared to be at his peak on his ranchera section — where his rich baritone sounds most at home, he even can hold his own with greats of the past".

According to Pollstar, the tour grossed 36.1 million and was attended by 450,000 spectators in 73 shows reported. During his concerts in Mexico City he received a special award, a Silver Dahlia for his 180 concerts at the National Auditorium since 1991, gathering 1.5 million spectators in total. In addiction, the tour received a nomination at the 2009 Latin Billboard Music Awards for the Latin Tour of the Year.

Tour set list

Tour dates

Cancelled shows

Band
Vocals: Luis Miguel
Acoustic & Electric guitar: Todd Robinson
Bass: Lalo Carrillo
Piano & Keyboards: Francisco Loyo
Keyboards & Programming: Salo Loyo
Drums: Victor Loyo
Percussion: Tommy Aros
Saxophone: Jeff Nathanson
Trumpet: Francisco Abonce
Trumpet: Ramón Flores
Trombone: Alejandro Carballo
Backing vocals: Maria Entraigues (2008–2009), Kacee Clanton (2008–2009), Vie le (2009)

Notes

References

External links
 Official site.

Luis Miguel concert tours
2008 concert tours
2009 concert tours